The Arbeit Workers Union (AWU), also abbreviated to Alba(-)nojo (literally Arbeit Union), is a trade union of part-time workers called "Areubaiteu" (from ) in South Korea. The AWU was founded in August 2013.

References

External links
 

Trade unions in South Korea
Trade unions established in 2013
2013 establishments in South Korea
Organizations based in Seoul
Precarious workers' trade unions